The Slammer (also known as The Slammer Returns for its final two series) is a children's talent show sitcom that was broadcast on BBC One and CBBC from 22 September 2006 until 26 July 2014.

Set in a fictional prison called HM Slammer, this programme follows a variety show format where "prisoners" (who have been arrested for "showbiz"-related crimes) compete, by performing to an audience, who decide which act should be released.

The show is produced by Steve Ryde, who also produced CBBC's Dick and Dom in Da Bungalow and its subsequent spin off, Harry Batt. It was based on an item from Dick and Dom called 'The Strangely Talented': a game in which contestants performed their specialised acts in front of the "Bungalow Heads" to try to win the title of Strangely Talented Champion.

Some of the supporting cast of Dick and Dom in Da Bungalow appear in The Slammer; Dave Chapman, Ian Kirkby, Lee Barnett and Melvin Odoom.

The show returned, after a two-year absence, to CBBC in October 2013, under the new name of 'The Slammer Returns'. Special editions of the show including 'The Slammer by the Sea' aired during the revived series.

On 2 June 2016, Ian Kirkby announced that the new series had ended, stating "Unfortunately CBBC have retired the Governor and Mr. Burgess, probably for good...but, never say never!"

Summary

Storyline 
The Slammer is a fictitious prison for entertainers who have "committed crimes against showbusiness"; the people are given the chance to earn their freedom by performing to a jury of children in the "Freedom Show".

The opening titles introduce the show's format, showing entertainers' acts going wrong, their incarceration, "polishing up their act" and performing to an audience of 8-12 year olds.  The lyrics describe this process and the titles conclude with a line of released tap-dancers shimmying out of the prison gate. British Illusionist Andrew Van Buren makes three appearances in the titles of the first four series.

The Slammer is headed by the "Governor," played by comedian Ted Robbins. The Governor always wears a white suit with a golden bow tie, and fulfills his duties by hosting the Freedom Show and occasionally quizzing audience members about their views on the "Performing Prisoners".

Supporting the Governor are prison wardens Frank Burgess, played by Ian Kirkby, and the Governor's dim-witted nephew, Jeremy Gimbert played by Lee Barnett.  The characters are complete opposites to one another: Burgess is intelligent, trustworthy and follows procedure and instructions carefully, accompanied by the physical mannerisms of Porridge's Mr Mackay. Gimbert is not the sharpest tool in the box and Burgess's frustration with his colleague's stupidity is often obvious.

Dave Chapman plays Peter Nokio, a long-term resident of The Slammer. He is a poor ventriloquist (his mouth moves when the puppet is speaking), having several puppets which he keeps personified at all times, allowing the puppets to make rude comments and reveal when Peter is telling a lie.

Peter's cell-mate Melvin (played by Melvin Odoom) is a former dancer whose act once went badly wrong in front of the Queen at the Royal Variety Performance, resulting in him suffering from seemingly incurable stage-fright.

The show begins with 5–10 minutes of storyline with these characters, often introducing celebrity guests who may play themselves or assume characters. Keith Harris and Orville once starred in a story where a performance had gone so badly that they froze and were taken to the Slammer; the supporting cast managed to revive them and they performed later in the show.

The Freedom Show 
After this, the performances begin. In-between each performance, the Governor and Mr. Burgess ask a few children on their thoughts. Traditionally Mr. Burgess asks a child to sum up the act with one word, before shouting it back to the Governor, addressing him as 'sir!' This is often found amusing and has led to children frequently creating nonsense words such as 'brillitastic', as Mr. Burgess would then have to shout "Brillitastic, Sir!"

Sometimes the stories are continued into the performance section. Between acts the television audience cut away to very short segments of the stories. This usually is done to create tension on stories where one of the prisoners is being devious (a prisoner is trying to escape while the guards are distracted, for example).

Four acts perform each episode, and the act who gets the most support through applause and cheering (measured by a clap-o-meter when a vote is taken at the end of the show) is released.

Solitary confinement 
Series 3 introduced a new item called "solitary confinement." This follows the prisoners who have supposedly been placed in solitary confinement for bad performances throughout the years. They are brought out and a child is chosen to watch their act. The child then decides whether the performer gets a "thumbs up" or a "thumbs down."

If they get a "thumbs up," the prisoner is allowed out of solitary confinement and a cell upgrade. However, if they get a "thumbs down," they are sent back to solitary confinement for a "cruel and unusual punishment" from the staff.

Cast and characters

Production
Early series of The Slammer were recorded at 3 Mills Studios in East London, by the BBC in high definition.

Series 3 and 4 were recorded at Elstree Film Studios in Borehamwood. From series 5 and 6, episodes were recorded at dock10 in Salford.

The prison door used in the series was filmed in the Welsh city of Swansea on Oystermouth Road, where HM Prison Swansea is located.

Theme tune
Like Dick and Dom in Da Bungalow, Andy Blythe & Marten Joustra were commissioned to write the theme.

Awards

 In November 2007 The Slammer won the Children's BAFTA for Best Entertainment Programme.

Celebrity Guests
The Slammer has featured many celebrity guests (usually entertainers) who either play themselves or characters in the storyline, perform or do both.

In 2006, the show was reprimanded by television regulator Ofcom after a complaint was received regarding a performance in which a mime artist put a rubber glove over his head, eyes and nose and blew it up. Ofcom formally recorded a breach against the show as it was felt that the sketch, particularly the performer's use of the glove, was presented as 'slapstick fun' and could be easily imitated by young children.

Transmissions

References

External links
 
 

"The Slammer" at Lightingdirector.co.uk

BBC children's television shows
2006 British television series debuts
2014 British television series endings
2000s British children's television series
2010s British children's television series
BBC high definition shows
British television shows featuring puppetry
English-language television shows
CBBC shows
Television series by BBC Studios
Television shows shot at Elstree Film Studios